Sporoplasm is an infectious material present in the cytoplasm of various fungi-like organisms, such as members of class Microsporidia. Sporoplasm is defined as a mass of protoplasm that gives rise to or forms a spore. The protoplasmic body that is released as an infective amoebula from a cnidosporidian cyst.



Mode of infection 
It is injected to host cell through a coiled polar tube which acts as a spring-like tubular extrusion mechanism. It is mainly involved in the asexual cycle of the organism.

Reproduction 
Inside the host cell, the sporoplasm multiplies to generate meronts, cells with loosely organized organelles enclosed in a simple plasma membrane. Multiplication occurs either by merogony (binary fission) or schizogony (multiple fission) or plasmotomy (division of nucleus without relation to cytoplasm to produce multi-nucleated offspring).

References 

Fungi
Microsporidia